Kruss or Krüss may refer to:

 Krüss Optronic, a German company
 Gerhard Krüss, German chemist
 James Krüss, German writer and illustrator

See also 
 Krus (disambiguation)